Ebenezer Church may refer to:

Australia
 Ebenezer Church (Australia)

Sierra Leone
 Ebenezer Methodist Church

United Kingdom
 Ebenezer, Llanelli, Wales

United States

 Ebenezer Spanish-English;Ministerios Ebenezer,California
 Ebenezer Lutheran Church, California
 Ebenezer African Methodist Episcopal Church and School, Georgia
 Ebenezer Methodist Episcopal Chapel and Cemetery, Illinois
 Ebenezer African Methodist Episcopal Church (Baltimore, Maryland), a Baltimore City Landmark
 Ebenezer Academy, Bethany Presbyterian Church and Cemetery, North Carolina
 Ebenezer Methodist Church (Bells, North Carolina)
 Ebenezer Lutheran Chapel, South Carolina
 Old Ebenezer Church, South Carolina
 Ebenezer Methodist Church, Earnest Farms Historic District, Tennessee
 Ebenezer Missionary Baptist Church (Chicago), Illinois

See also
 Ebenezer (disambiguation)
 Ebenezer Baptist Church (disambiguation)
 Ebenezer Chapel (disambiguation)
 Ebenezer Presbyterian Church (disambiguation)
 Battle of Ebenezer Church (1865), Plantersville, Alabama, United States
 Ebenezer (hymn)
 Ebenezer Academy, South Carolina, United States
 Ebenezer Bible College and Seminary, Philippines